Natasha Tara Miles (born 19 October 1988) is a Hong Kong cricketer who currently plays for Middlesex and Hong Kong. An all-rounder, she is a right-handed batter and right-arm medium bowler. She has previously played for Surrey and Otago, as well as Lancashire Thunder in the Women's Cricket Super League. She made her Twenty20 International debut on 22 November 2021, for Hong Kong against Nepal.

Early life
Miles was born on 19 October 1988 in Hong Kong.

Domestic career

County cricket
Miles made her county debut in 2007, for Surrey against Somerset. Overall that season she took 5 wickets at an average of 20.40. In 2009, she took 7 wickets in the County Championship, as well as helping Surrey win the inaugural Twenty20 Cup.

In 2010, Miles moved to Middlesex. She hit her maiden county half-century that season, scoring 50 against Worcestershire, as well as taking 13 wickets at an average of 18.07 in the County Championship. She took her maiden five-wicket haul the following season, with 5/31 Yorkshire. In 2013, Miles was Middlesex's leading run-scorer in the County Championship, with 317 runs including her maiden county century, scoring 100 against Kent. The following season, she was her side's leading run-scorer in both competitions, with 247 runs in the County Championship and 166 in the Twenty20 Cup. Miles played primarily as a batter over subsequent seasons, and consistently scored over 100 runs a season in the County Championship, as well as helping her side win the 2018 Women's Twenty20 Cup. She played eight matches for the side in the 2021 Women's Twenty20 Cup, scoring 51 runs. She played four matches in the 2022 Women's Twenty20 Cup, scoring 151 runs including two half-centuries. She has also captained Middlesex in 13 T20s between 2017 and 2022.

Kia Super League
Miles played for Lancashire Thunder in the Women's Cricket Super League between 2016 and 2018. She played 7 matches in 2016 and 2017, scoring 7 runs and taking 3 catches.

Other domestic cricket
Miles played for Otago in the 2010–11 and 2011–12 seasons. She was the joint-leading wicket-taker across the whole tournament in the Twenty20 competition in 2010–11, with 14 wickets at an average of 14.64. In her second season with the side, she took 10 wickets across the two competitions.

Miles also appeared in the Super Fours between 2011 and 2013, for Emeralds and Sapphires. In 2012, she took 4/51 for Emeralds in a match against Diamonds.

International career
In 2006, Miles appeared in three 50-over matches for Hong Kong against Pakistan in the Asian sub-qualifier for the 2008 Women's Cricket World Cup Qualifier. She scored 56 runs across the three matches and took one wicket.

Miles stopped playing for Hong Kong in order to attempt to play for England, but did appear for them in one match against Marylebone Cricket Club Women in 2018, where she captained the side and top scored with 42.

In October 2021, it was announced that Miles was returning to play for Hong Kong, being named in their squad for the 2021 ICC Women's T20 World Cup Asia Qualifier. She made her Women's Twenty20 International (WT20I) debut on 22 November 2021, against Nepal, scoring 16 off 13 deliveries. She played all five matches in the tournament, scoring 127 runs, the third most for her side, including hitting 40* against Kuwait. In April 2022, Miles played in Hong Kong's series against the UAE, but scored just 11 runs in the four match series. In June 2022, she played four matches in the 2022 ACC Women's T20 Championship, scoring 82 runs. In November 2022, she was the leading run-scorer at the East Asia Cup, with 149 runs at an average of 74.50, including making her Twenty20 high score in the third match of the tournament, with 86* from 70 deliveries.

References

External links

1988 births
Living people
Hong Kong women cricketers
Hong Kong women Twenty20 International cricketers
Surrey women cricketers
Middlesex women cricketers
Otago Sparks cricketers
Lancashire Thunder cricketers